Mehrabad (also Romanized as Mehrābād; also known as Mehrābād-e Bālā) is a village in Korbal Rural District, in the Central District of Kharameh County, Fars Province, Iran. At the 2006 census, its population was 576, in 122 families.

References 

Populated places in Kharameh County